Walid Aïchour (born 17 November 1977, in Tremblay-en-France) is a French former professional footballer who played as a midfielder. He coaches Championnat de France amateur club ES Viry-Châtillon.

He played on the professional level in Ligue 2 for FC Istres.

References

1977 births
Living people
People from Tremblay-en-France
Association football midfielders
Footballers from Seine-Saint-Denis
French footballers
Ligue 2 players
AJ Auxerre players
Red Star F.C. players
Olympique Noisy-le-Sec players
FC Istres players
AS Cannes players
FC Rouen players
ES Viry-Châtillon players
Blois Football 41 players